A cross-bolted bearing is a bearing, usually a crankshaft main bearing of a piston engine. Most bearing caps are retained by two bolts, one on each side of the bearing journal, and parallel to the cylinder axis (or, on vee engines, parallel to an axis bisecting the vee angle). A cross-bolted bearing has one or more additional bolts, at right-angles to both the cylinder and crankshaft axes. These bolts may be either a single through bolt passing through the crankcase from one side to the other, or else two blind bolts threaded into the bearing cap from each side.

Cross-bolting has two advantages: it couples the two sides of the crankcase together, making it stiffer overall and less prone to twisting. Secondly it helps to hold the bearing cap down against the downward force from the piston. This second advantage is usually only possible with blind bolts, as the dowel effect of a through bolt is less effective.

See also
Main bearing

References

Engine components
Engine technology
Bearings (mechanical)
Threaded fasteners